The Cyrillization of Chinese (Hanyu Cyril Pinyin) is the transcription of Chinese characters into the Cyrillic alphabet.

The Palladius System is the official Russian standard for transcribing Chinese into Russian, with variants existing for Ukrainian, Belarusian, Bulgarian, and other languages that use the Cyrillic alphabet. It was created by Palladius Kafarov, a Russian sinologist and monk who spent thirty years in China in the nineteenth century.

Russian system

Initials 
Note that because the Russian version of the Cyrillic alphabet has no letters for dz or dzh (although дз and дж are found in Bulgarian, and also ѕ and џ are found in Serbian and Macedonian Cyrillic), the digraphs цз and чж are used respectively.

Finals

In composites, coda ng is transcribed нъ when the following syllable starts with a vowel. For example, the names of the cities of Chang'an and Hengyang are transcribed as Чанъань and Хэнъян.

In syllables with no initial, w is transcribed as в in all cases except wu, transcribed as у. For example, the names of the cities of Wuwei (both Wuwei, Anhui and Wuwei, Gansu) and Wanning are transcribed as Увэй and Ваньнин.

Comparison chart 
This table establishes correspondence between the Russian Palladius system together with the two Romanization systems  most commonly used in English-speaking countries: Pinyin and Wade–Giles.

Exceptions 
The names of the cities of Beijing and Nanjing are transcribed as Пеки́н (instead of Бэйцзин) and Нанки́н (instead of Наньцзин), much as Peking and Nanking were still used in English speaking countries until recently. Hong Kong (pinyin: Xianggang) may be both Сянга́н (Xianggang) and Гонко́нг (Hong Kong); the latter is more common.

The syllable hui is transcribed not as хуй but as хуэй (Huizu, Хуэйцзу) or, less often, as хой (Anhui, Аньхой) for aesthetic reasons, since  is a taboo word for "penis" in Russian and several other Slavic languages.

Older documents contain variants мэн — мын, мэнь — мынь, фэн — фын, фэнь — фынь, пэн — пын, hence Aomen (Macao) is traditionally spelled Аомынь in Russian. Most modern texts contain э, with some exceptions.

Ukrainian system

Initials

Finals

In composites, coda ng is transcribed н' when the following syllable starts with a vowel. For example, the names of the cities of Chang'an and Hengyang are transcribed as Чан'ань and Хен'ян.

In syllables with no initial, w is transcribed as в in all cases except wu, transcribed as у. For example, the names of the cities of Wuwei and Wanning are transcribed as Увей and Ваньнін.

Comparison chart 
This table establishes correspondence between the Ukrainian Palladius system together with the two Romanization systems  most commonly used in English-speaking countries: Pinyin and Wade–Giles.

Cyrillization with the Ukrainian alphabet differs from the Russian as follows:
 е → є
 ё → йо
 э → е
 г → ґ
 и → і
 in жи, чжи, чи, ши (ri, zhi, chi, shi) still и is used
 Syllables without initial consonant start with ї (yi, yin, ying → ї, їнь, їн).
 ы → и
 ъ → ' (apostrophe)

Belarusian system 

Cyrillization with the Belarusian alphabet differs from the Russian as follows:
 ао, яо → аа, яа (in accordance with Belarusian akanye)
 и → і
 in ri, zhi, chi, shi there is ы (жы, чжы, чы, шы).
 ъ → ' (apostrophe)

Serbian system 

The Serbian system is rather different from the Russian: for example, j, q, zh are transcribed as ђ, ћ, џ; the Serbian letters ј, љ, њ appear where the Russian system uses я, е, ё, ю, й; final n and ng are н and нг.

Macedonian system
Source:

Initials

Finals

W- and y- are transcribed as в- and ј-.

Table of cyrillization systems

Sample texts

See also
Palladius table
Dungan language
Taz language
Romanization of Chinese
Cyrillization of Japanese

References

External links
 Automatic Cyrillic transliteration of pinyin
 Annotation of Chinese with Palladius and other phonetic systems

Chinese
Transcription of Chinese
China–Russia relations